Jason Samuel Christiansen (born September 21, 1969) is a former Major League Baseball left-handed relief pitcher.

Biography
Christiansen was born in Omaha, Nebraska and attended Elkhorn High School. He is an alumnus of Cameron University. He was signed by the Pittsburgh Pirates as an amateur free agent in 1991, Christiansen made his Major League Baseball debut with the Pirates on April 26, 1995.

Christiansen gained national attention for his heated rivalry with fellow San Francisco Giants teammate Barry Bonds during the 2005 season. The rivalry was documented in the 2006 book Game of Shadows. Christiansen was traded to the Los Angeles Angels of Anaheim on August 30, 2005, for minor league pitchers Dusty Bergman and Ronnie Ray.

On December 13, 2007, he was named in the Mitchell Report to the Commissioner of Baseball of an Independent Investigation Into the Illegal Use of Steroids and Other Performance Enhancing Substances by Players in Major League Baseball.

Christiansen is the CEO & co-Owner of Rigid Industries LED Lighting, Inc., a manufacturer of high end LED lighting systems.

See also
List of Major League Baseball players named in the Mitchell Report

References

External links

Christiansen won't be back with Angels

1969 births
Living people
Major League Baseball pitchers
Baseball players from Nebraska
Sportspeople from Omaha, Nebraska
Pittsburgh Pirates players
St. Louis Cardinals players
San Francisco Giants players
Los Angeles Angels players
Carolina Mudcats players
Buffalo Bisons (minor league) players
Altoona Curve players
Nashville Sounds players
Memphis Redbirds players
Fresno Grizzlies players
Cameron Aggies baseball players
Augusta Pirates players
Calgary Cannons players
American expatriate baseball players in Canada
Gulf Coast Pirates players
Salem Buccaneers players
San Jose Giants players
Welland Pirates players